Lords of Creation is a multi-genre tabletop role-playing game published by Avalon Hill in 1983. The game and its accompanying adventures were written by Tom Moldvay, who also worked on the games Dungeons & Dragons and Star Frontiers.

Description
Lords of Creation is not set in a single genre but is designed to allow players to play their characters through scenarios in settings varying from fantasy to science fiction to modern espionage. Characters gain powers and skills as they progress, including magical abilities and high tech cybernetics. Their progression leads to demigod status – eventually powerful characters become "Lords of Creation", with the ability to create their own pocket universe.

Players with a "Lord of Creation" character can then take on the role of gamemaster, refereeing the game in their character's pocket universe.

Components
The boxed set contains 
 a 64-page rulebook 
 a 64-page Book of Foes containing a bestiary, as well as historical figures and examples of other Lords of Creation
a 20-sided die, a 10-sided die, and a 6-sided die

Adventures
Three adventure modules were published for the game:
The Horn of Roland, an introductory adventure that starts at a modern-day science fiction convention and eventually leads to the Bermuda Triangle.
The Yeti Sanction, a modern-day espionage scenario involving the kidnapping of the American Secretary of State. The adventure also includes a gamemaster's screen, and expanded rules for vehicles.
Omegakron, a post-apocalyptic science fiction adventure set in Akron, Ohio after a nuclear war. This module contains a pad of blank character sheets.

Five adventures were originally announced, but the final two, The Tower of Ilium and The Mines of Voria, were never released.

Publication history
Avalon Hill published Lords of Creation in 1983, a boxed set designed by Tom Moldvay, with art by Jean Baer, Dave Billman and Bob Haynes. Three adventures for the game were published the following year, but poor sales quickly brought production to a close.

Reception
In Issue 6 of Fantasy Gamer, Warren Spector thought the game was "hopelessly mediocre—good at some things but great at none." However, he realized that the game might be of value for players new to role-playing games.

Mike Dean reviewed Lords of Creation for Imagine magazine, and stated that "All in all, LoC is a powerful new concept in RPGs and should do well in sales."

In a retrospective review on the website Black Gate, Ty Johnston called Lords of Creation "very much a game of its time, but in many way it’s also a game ahead of its time [...] one of the earliest to stretch beyond the boundaries of any single genre."

Other reviews
Different Worlds No. 37 (Nov./Dec. 1984)

References

External links 
 Review at RPG.Net
 GROGNARDIA: Retrospective: Lords of Creation
 Jeff's Gameblog: Five Overlooked RPGs
 Entry at RPGgeek.com
Article in Black Gate

Avalon Hill games
Fantasy role-playing games
Role-playing games introduced in 1983
Science fantasy role-playing games
Science fiction role-playing games
Campaign settings